The Codex Trivulzianus is a manuscript by Leonardo da Vinci that originally contained 62 sheets, but today only 55 remain. It documents Leonardo's attempts to improve his modest literary education, through long lists of learned words copied from authoritative lexical and grammatical sources. The manuscript also contains studies of military and religious architecture.

The Codex Trivulzianus is kept at Sforza Castle in Milan, Italy, but is not normally available to the public. In the main museum a room also contains frescos painted by Leonardo.

External links 

 Institute Institute and Museum of the History of Science - Florence, Italy
 The Mind of Leonardo
 The Real Da Vinci Code
 The Official Castello Sforzesco Website
Leonardo da Vinci: anatomical drawings from the Royal Library, Windsor Castle, exhibition catalog fully online as PDF from The Metropolitan Museum of Art, which contains material on Codex Trivulzianus (see index)

16th-century books
Scientific illuminated manuscripts
Codices by Leonardo da Vinci